Papai (also Romanized as Pāpā’ī; also known as Papan) is a village in Mojezat Rural District, in the Central District of Zanjan County, Zanjan Province, Iran. At the 2006 census, its population was 724, in 189 families.

References 

Populated places in Zanjan County